Ardozyga flexilis is a species of moth in the family Gelechiidae. It was described by Edward Meyrick in 1904. It is found in Australia, where it has been recorded from New South Wales.

The forewings are fuscous, irrorated (speckled) with dark fuscous and finely sprinkled with whitish. The stigmata are dark fuscous, the plical obliquely beyond the first discal and another similar dot beneath the second discal. The hindwings are pale grey.

References

Ardozyga
Moths described in 1904
Taxa named by Edward Meyrick
Moths of Australia